Gelmini is an Italian surname. Notable people with the surname include:

Mariastella Gelmini (born 1973), Italian politician and attorney
Pierino Gelmini, Italian Roman Catholic priest 
Marcos Paulo Gelmini Gomes, (born 1988) Brazilian footballer of partial Italian descent 

Italian-language surnames